Lissotesta similis is a species of sea snail, a marine gastropod mollusk, unassigned in the superfamily Seguenzioidea.

Description

Distribution
This species occurs in Antarctic waters.

References

 Engl W. (2012) Shells of Antarctica. Hackenheim: Conchbooks. 402 pp

similis
Gastropods described in 1912